Route 94 is an east–west state highway in Connecticut running for  from Route 2 (Exit 8) in Glastonbury to Route 85 in Hebron.

Route description

Route 94 officially begins as the Exit 8 offramp of eastbound Route 2 in western Glastonbury (in the Addison section of town). Hebron Avenue continues eastward through Glastonbury for another , meeting with Route 83 (which heads for Manchester and East Glastonbury). After another , it crosses Roaring Brook and becomes mainly a rural collector road as it heads towards the town of Hebron. Along the way it passes by the Macclain Earth Products factory as it traverses the rural part of Glastonbury. Gilead Street continues further east as southbound Route 85 towards the town center of Hebron.

Route 94 is designated the 94th Infantry Division Memorial Highway from Route 2 to the Glastonbury-Hebron town line.

History 
In the early 1920s, State Highway 165 was designated as the road from Main Street in Glastonbury Center (at New England Route 17), through Addison, to then State Highway 164 (now Route 83). In the 1932 state highway renumbering, modern Route 94 was created from the entire length of former Highway 165 as well as an eastward extension to newly established Route 85 in Hebron. In 1957, when after the portion of the Route 2 expressway in Glastonbury opened, Route 2 was relocated to the new expressway and the western terminus of Route 94 was also moved to the current location. There have also been several curves straightened in Glastonbury between 1958 and 2004.

Junction list

References

External links

094
Transportation in Hartford County, Connecticut
Transportation in Tolland County, Connecticut